Udanchhoo is a 2018 Indian Hindi-language comedy film directed by Vipin Parashar, and starring Prem Chopra, Rajneesh Duggal, Ashutosh Rana, Bruna Abdullah and Saisha Sehgal. Written by Vishal Kumar Patil and produced by Ravindra Singh under the banner of R-Vision India, this con-comedy is set in the metropolitan city of Mumbai, basing its narrative on how many of today's spiritual leaders use their influence to fool and misguide their followers and use them as a means for their black money operations.

Story
The film revolves around the lead protagonists Vikram (Rajneesh Duggal), Guru G (Prem Chopra) and Shanti (Saisha Sehgal). Guru G, under the garb of a pious spiritual guru, is running a black money operation through his ashram with help from his trusted devotee Billu (Ashutosh Rana) and Julia (Bruna Abdullah). The film goes on to show how all the characters get involved in a huge con mystery resulting in a funny and dramatic climax. The story is by Vishal Kumar Patil.

Cast

 Prem Chopra as Guru Ji
 Ashutosh Rana as Billu Kabootar
 Rajneesh Duggal as Vikram
 Bruna Abdullah as Julia
 Lankesh Bhardwaj as Balwinder 
 Saisha Sehgal as Shanti
 Anil George as Dhanraj Singhania 
 Brijendra Kala as Kal Bhairav (Lawyer)
 Amanda Rosario as Sarkar Item Girl

Soundtrack 
The music of the film is composed by Avishek Majumder, Pravin-Manoj and Atharva Joshi while the lyrics have been penned by Rani Malik, Tahmina Khaleel, Ajay Milind, Jairaj Selwan and Vishal Kumar Patil. The first track of the film is titled as "Sarkar" which is sung by Rani Hazarika, starring Amanda Rosario.

Release and reception
The film released on 5 January 2018. A Free Press Journal gave movie a 1.5 Rating Out of 5 and wrote "A clueless attempt at comedy."

References

Rajneesh Duggall plays various parts as conman in 'Udanchhoo'

Rajneesh Duggal replaces Gautam Gulati in 'Udanchoo' - Times of India
Quite a beginning. Tribune India.

External links
 Udanchhoo at the Internet Movie Database
 

2018 films
2010s Hindi-language films
Indian comedy films
2018 comedy films